Kvingra or Kvingla is a peninsula in the municipality of Nærøysund in Trøndelag county, Norway. Kvingla is surrounded by the Sørsalten fjord to the south, the Nærøysundet strait in the northwest, and the Nordsalten fjord in the northeast. The island was originally connected to the mainland on a tiny isthmus of land in the southeast, but there is a man-made canal through it, so the island now is technically an island. The  peninsula has a population of about 400 (as of 2001). The largest population center on the island is the village of Ottersøya on the southwestern tip of the peninsula.

References

Nærøysund
Peninsulas of Trøndelag